William H. & William S. Edwards House, also known as Bellefleur, is a historic home located at Coalburg, Kanawha County, West Virginia. The main house was built in 1871, and consists of a large -story main block with a rambling rear wing. It is a frame house that features Italianate style decorative detail. Also on the property are a contributing carriage house, wooden trellis, and the original cobblestone drive and entrance columns. It was the home of noted entomologist William Henry Edwards (1822–1909).

It was listed on the National Register of Historic Places in 1990.

References

Houses completed in 1871
Houses in Kanawha County, West Virginia
Houses on the National Register of Historic Places in West Virginia
Italianate architecture in West Virginia
National Register of Historic Places in Kanawha County, West Virginia